Heath Terrence Ramsay (born 3 April 1981) is a former butterfly swimmer who competed for Australia at the 2000 Summer Olympics in Sydney, Australia. There he finished in eleventh position in the 200-metre butterfly, clocking 1:57.90 minutes in the B-Final.

Early life 
Ramsay was born in 1981 in Ipswich, Queensland. After finishing at St Edmund's College, Ipswich, he went to the University of Queensland.

Olympic career 
In the lead-up to the 2000 Summer Olympics, he paused his commerce degree to focus on swimming.
Ramsay qualified for the 2000 Olympics by winning the 200-metre butterfly at the Australian championships.

Post Olympic career 
Retiring from swimming in 2003, Heath founded a successful learn to swim centre in Ipswich.

References

1981 births
Living people
Australian male butterfly swimmers
Olympic swimmers of Australia
Swimmers at the 2000 Summer Olympics
Sportspeople from Ipswich, Queensland
21st-century Australian people